Charley's Grants was a British television comedy aired in 1970 on BBC Two. It was written by N. F. Simpson, John Fortune, and John Wells and produced by Ian MacNaughton (who produced Monty Python’s Flying Circus) Cast included Willoughby Goddard, Hattie Jacques, Diana King, Aubrey Morris and Keith Smith. The series is considered a lost television broadcast, with all six episodes missing.

References

External links
Charley's Grants on IMDb

1970 British television series debuts
1970 British television series endings
Lost BBC episodes
English-language television shows
BBC television sitcoms
1970s British comedy television series